Jorge Castañeda y Álvarez de la Rosa (1 October 1921  – 11 December 1997) was a Mexican diplomat. He served as Secretary of Foreign Affairs from April 1979 to 30 November 1982, during the administration of José López Portillo.
He was the father of Jorge Castañeda Gutman, who later also served as Foreign Secretary from 2000 to 2003.

Born in Mexico City, Castañeda y Álvarez studied law at the National Autonomous University of Mexico  (UNAM), where he also later lectured, along with teaching positions at the Colegio de México and the Escuela Libre de Derecho. In addition to his term as foreign secretary, he also served as ambassador to France, Egypt, and the United Nations.

External links
Biografía de Jorge Castañeda y Álvarez de la Rosa SRE biography
Jorge Castañeda y Álvarez de la Rosa obituary, La Jornada, 12 December 1997

1921 births
People from Mexico City
Mexican diplomats
Mexican Secretaries of Foreign Affairs
National Autonomous University of Mexico alumni
Academic staff of the National Autonomous University of Mexico
Colegio de Mexico faculty
1997 deaths